Indonesia is a member of the Southeast Asian Zone of the Olympic Council of Asia (OCA), and has competed in all editions of the Asian Games since it was first held in 1951, one of only seven countries to do so.

Hosted Games
Jakarta, the national capital of Indonesia, has hosted the Asian Games in 1962 Asian Games and the 2018 Asian Games with Palembang.

Asian Games

*Red border color indicates tournament was held on home soil.

With 446 medals, Indonesia currently on 9th rank in all times Asian Games medal table.

Highest achievement of Indonesia was in 2018 Asian Games at Jakarta and Palembang with 31 golds and 98 total medals surpassed the previous 1962 Asian Games medals achievement but not with the final ranking. This is the second time that Indonesia get more than 10 golds, there are in 1962 Asian Games and 2018 Asian Games. 

All this medal table refers to Olympic Council of Asia official website.

Medals by games

Medals by sport

Medalists

Athletics

Archery

Badminton

Beach volleyball

Bodybuilding

Bowling

Boxing

Canoeing – sprint

Contract bridge

Cue sports

Cycling - BMX

Cycling -– mountain bike

Cycling – road

Cycling – track

Diving

Dragon boat

Equestrian

Fencing

Football

Gymnastics – artistic

Jet Ski

Judo

Karate

Kurash

Paragliding

Pencak Silat

Roller sports – skateboarding

Rowing

Sailing

Sepaktakraw

Shooting

Soft tennis

Sport climbing

Swimming

Table tennis

Taekwondo

Tennis

Volleyball

Water polo

Weightlifting

Wrestling

Wushu

Asian Winter Games

Medals by games

Asian Para Games 

*Red border color indicates tournament was held on home soil.

Medals by games

Asian Beach Games

*Red border color indicates tournament was held on home soil.

Medals by games

Asian Indoor and Martial Arts Games

Medals by games

Medalists 
*This list only includes the medalists from Asian Indoor and Martial Arts Games (2013 Incheon and 2017 Ashgabat).

 Alysh 

 Bowling 

 Chess 

 Ju-jitsu 

 Sambo 

 Swimming 

 Taekwondo 

 Tennis 

 Track cycling 

 Traditional wrestling 

 Weightlifting 

Asian Youth Games*Red border color indicates tournament was held on home soil.''

Medals by games

Asian Youth Para Games

Medals by games

See also
 Indonesia at the Olympics
 Indonesia at the Paralympics
 Indonesia at the Southeast Asian Games

References